OK3 may refer to:
OK3 (television), Czechoslovakia television station
OK3, trio of basketball players on the 2017–18 Oklahoma City Thunder team